Seodaemun Prison History Hall is a museum and former prison in Seodaemun-gu, Seoul, South Korea.  It was constructed beginning in 1907. The prison was opened on October 21, 1908, under the name Gyeongseong Gamok. During the early part of the Japanese colonial period it was known as Keijo Prison (the Japanese pronunciation of Gyeongseong Gamok). Its name was changed to Seodaemun Prison in 1923, and it later had several other names.

History
The prison was used during the Japanese colonial period to imprison Korean liberation activists, and could originally hold around 500 inmates. It had a separate facility for women and young girls. In 1911, Kim Koo was imprisoned. He was one of the more important figures in the Korean liberation movement. In 1919, shortly after the March 1st Movement, the number of imprisoned increased drastically. About three thousand liberation activists were imprisoned, and shortly before the colonization ended in 1945, the number of prisoners was at 2980. Among imprisoned after the March 1st Movement was Ryu Gwansun, who died from the torture inflicted on her.

After the colonial era ended in 1945 as part of the surrender of Japan in World War II, the prison was used by the South Korean government, and was known by various official names, including Seoul Prison until 1961, Seoul Correctional Institute until 1967 and Seoul Detention Center until its closure in 1987. It was replaced by a facility in Uiwang City, Gyeonggi Province.

In 1992, the site was dedicated as the Seodaemun Prison History Hall, part of Seodaemun Independence Park. Seven of the prison complex's original fifteen buildings are preserved as historical monuments. The History Hall showcases all those imprisoned during the Japanese colonial period and continues to serve as a memorial hall.

During a visit to Seodaemun in August 2015, former Japanese prime minister Yukio Hatoyama knelt in front of a memorial stone as an expression of apology for Japanese war crimes in World War II.

Location 
 
Seodaemun Independence Park, including Seodaemun Prison, is easily accessed from exits 4 or 5 of the Dongnimmun Station on Seoul Subway Line 3.

See also
Korea under Japanese rule
Independence Gate

References

External links

Seodaemun Prison History Hall
Lifeinkorea profile
Seoul City Parks profile

Seodaemun District
Prison museums in Asia
Prisons in South Korea
Museums in Seoul
Korea under Japanese rule
Historic Sites of South Korea
Government buildings completed in 1908
History museums in South Korea
1908 establishments in Korea

Japanese prisoner of war and internment camps